The Iosefin Synagogue is a synagogue in the Iosefin district of Timișoara. Built in 1895, it is one of the three large synagogues in the city, and the last still functioning.

History 
The community of Orthodox Jews in Iosefin, formed in 1871, met until 1894 in rented premises. The synagogue was inaugurated on 18 September 1895, on the eve of Rosh HaShanah. Rabbi Bernát Schück, as the leader of the community, made an effective contribution to its construction. Carol Telbisz, the mayor of Timișoara, was also present at its inauguration. Built according to the plans of the architect  in an eclectic style with neo-Moorish, neo-Romanesque and neo-Gothic ornaments, the synagogue is modest in size compared to the other two large synagogues in the city. In 1910, the synagogue was enlarged, but photographs from 1914 and 1915 show that the synagogue had only one central dome. Later it acquired its current appearance, with two central domes and two smaller, lateral ones.

In the courtyard of the synagogue there were a cheder (kindergarten), a mikveh (ritual bath) and a shechita slaughterhouse. The Orthodox primary school, established in 1918, moved ten years later to a new building at the end of the courtyard. The marble plaque inside the synagogue commemorates the construction of the school in 1928, honoring the names of those who contributed: First Rabbi Bernát Schück, Community President Jakab Rothbart, architects Arnold Merbl and Jakab Klein and others.

At present, the Iosefin Synagogue is used only on Friday evenings, Saturday mornings and holidays.

References

External links 
 Virtual tour of the synagogue

See also 

 History of the Jews in Romania
 Cetate Synagogue
 Fabric Synagogue

Orthodox Judaism in Romania
Orthodox synagogues
Synagogues in Timișoara
Synagogues completed in 1895
1895 establishments in Austria-Hungary
Moorish Revival synagogues
Gothic Revival synagogues
Religious organizations established in 1895